Olena Fedorivna Bondarenko is a member of All-Ukrainian Union "Fatherland", People's Deputy of Verkhovna Rada of Ukraine, Chairman of the Subcommittee on gender issues at the Committee on human rights, national minorities and international relations (since July 2006), member of Bloc Yulia Tymoshenko fraction (from May 2006 till December 2012).
In 2000, she was awarded with Order of Merit, III class.

Biography

Bondarenko was born on February 13, 1955, in Taishet, Irkutsk region, Russia in a concentration camp for political prisoners. Her father was a surgeon Ferenc Varkoni (1920–1988), her mother Olga Bondarenko (b. 1926) was an engineer.
Bondarenko is married, her husband Dmitry Basiliya (b. 1948) is a physician, they have one daughter Olga (b. 1990).
She graduated Taras Shevchenko National University of Kyiv twice: 
 1994 - Faculty of Journalism
 2000 - Legal Faculty

Career

 August 1979 - June 1983 - Accountant, Luhansk Organization of the Union of Writers of Ukraine
 February 1984 - August 1986 - Assistant, Luhansk organization of the "Znanie" (eng.- knowledge) society
 September 1986- May 1993 - radio announcer, Luhansk clothing association "Style", correspondent of the newspaper "Patriot Rodiny" (eng.- patriot of the homeland)
Mai 1989 - June 1990 VKR UNDL.  December 1989- October 1991 - Deputy Chairman, Luhansk regional Rukh organization
 October 1991 - June 1993 - chairman, Lugansk regional Rukh organization
 June 1993-April 1994 - Head of political analysis department, Rukh secretariat
 April 1994 - 1997 - Deputy Chairman of the Rukh movement, Head of ideology, propaganda and agitation sector
 January 1997 - May 1998 - editor-in-chief of the newspaper "Chas/Time"

Verkhovna Rada

 March 1998 - April 2002 - People's Deputy of Ukraine in the 3rd Verkhovna Rada, No. 13 on the list, elected from Rukh.
At the time of the election Bondarenko was Deputy Chairman of the Rukh movement, editor-in-chief of the newspaper "Chas/Time". In Verkhovna Rada she was member of the Committee on Rules, deputy ethics and organizational management of Verkhovna Rada of Ukraine (since July 1998).
 January 2005-April 2006 - People's Deputy of the 4th convocation in Verkhovna Rada, from the Viktor Yushchenko bloc "Our Ukraine", No. 74 in the list. Member of the Committee on freedom of speech and information (since April 2005).
 since April 2006 - People's Deputy of Ukraine in the 5th Verkhovna Rada, elected from the Yulia Tymoshenko Bloc, No. 89 in the list. At the time of elections she was MP, a member of the Fatherland bloc.
 since November 2007 - People's Deputy of the 6th convocation, elected from Yulia Tymoshenko bloc
 Chairman of the Subcommittee on international legal affairs and gender policy committee of the Verkhovna Rada of Ukraine on human rights, national minorities and international relations
 Member of Returning Board of the 6th Verkhovna Rada of Ukraine
 Member of the Ukrainian part of the Interparliamentary Assembly of the Verkhovna Rada of Ukraine, the Seimas of the Republic of Lithuania and the Sejm and Senate of Poland
 Member of the Ukrainian part of the Interparliamentary Assembly of Ukraine and the Republic of Poland
 Member of the permanent delegation to the Parliamentary Assembly of the Council of Europe
 Member of the Group for Interparliamentary Relations with the Republic of Lithuania
 Member of the Group for Interparliamentary Relations with the French Republic
 Member of the Group for Interparliamentary Relations with the Federal Republic of Germany
 Member of the Group for Interparliamentary Relations with the Republic of Portugal
 Member of the Group for Interparliamentary Relations with the Kingdom of Malaysia
 Member of the Group for Interparliamentary Relations with Poland
 Member of the Group for Interparliamentary Relations with Israel
 Member of the Group for Interparliamentary Relations with the Great Socialist People's Libyan Arab Jamahiriya
 Member of the Group for Interparliamentary Relations with the Republic of Croatia

Bondarenko was placed at number 105 on the electoral list of Batkivshchina during the 2012 Ukrainian parliamentary election. She was not re-elected into parliament. She did not participate in the 2014 Ukrainian parliamentary election.

Hobbies

Bondarenko is fond of poetry and music. She's been the author of the collection of poems "Youth Age" (1980). Her works were printed in Bulgarian, Polish, Belarusian and Russian languages.  She is fluent in the Polish language.

See also

All-Ukrainian Union "Fatherland"
2007 Ukrainian parliamentary election
List of Ukrainian Parliament Members 2007

References 

Living people
1955 births
People's Movement of Ukraine politicians
All-Ukrainian Union "Fatherland" politicians
Third convocation members of the Verkhovna Rada
Fourth convocation members of the Verkhovna Rada
Fifth convocation members of the Verkhovna Rada
Sixth convocation members of the Verkhovna Rada
Ukrainian journalists
People from Irkutsk Oblast
Russian people of Ukrainian descent
Russian emigrants to Ukraine
Taras Shevchenko National University of Kyiv alumni
Recipients of the Order of Merit (Ukraine), 3rd class
21st-century Ukrainian women politicians
20th-century Ukrainian women politicians
Women members of the Verkhovna Rada